Amphisbaena fuliginosa, also known as the black-and-white worm lizard, speckled worm lizard or spotted worm lizard, is a species of amphisbaenian in the genus Amphisbaena. The ecology of A. fuliginosa is poorly known due to its fossorial habits. However, this species can be easily distinguished from others because of its characteristic white and black mosaic pattern that covers both the dorsal and ventral side.

Geographic range
It is found in northern South America including the island of Trinidad, and southwards to the Brazilian Cerrado biome. The southernmost areas of the Brazilian Cerrado where A. fuliginosa is found is Minas Gerais, and Goiás.

Description

Habitat
It inhabits Amazonian forest areas.

Behavior and diet
It is a burrowing nocturnal species and spends most of its time underground. A. fuliginosa will feed on any small invertebrate, or insect, that it can find while burrowing. Some of those insects include beetles, ants, termites, and other arthropods (such as spiders and centipedes), but they also consume species of Orthoptera, such as crickets and grasshoppers, and sometimes on small vertebrates. When it finds its prey it will use its strong jaws to catch and kill it.

Reproduction
This species is oviparous.

Human interaction
In Yanomami mythology Amphisbaena are said to emerge from the spinal columns of warriors killed in battle, and have a supernatural connection to the underworld. When one is encountered in a village it is customary to ask it "Who are you? Where do you come from?" If it responds with a high pitch cry it has good intentions. If it remains silent it may have nefarious intentions.

References

fuliginosa
Reptiles of Brazil
Reptiles of Colombia
Reptiles of French Guiana
Reptiles of Guyana
Reptiles of Peru
Reptiles of Suriname
Reptiles of Venezuela
Reptiles described in 1758
Taxa named by Carl Linnaeus